Novokubansk is a town and the administrative center of Novokubansky District of Krasnodar Krai, Russia, located on the Kuban River. Population: 35,199 (2020),  The population of Novokubansk accounts for 40.4% of the district's total population.

History
When the Caucasian War ended, in 1867, former soldiers decided to settle in a place which is now known as Novokubansk. In 1936, Novokubansk became the administrative center of Novokubansky District. During World War II, the town was occupied by the German troops on August 6, 1942 and remained occupied until its liberation on January 25, 1943. Six soldiers were killed and sixteen were wounded during the last battle. Rapidly growing Novokubansk was granted town status 1966.

Administrative and municipal status
Within the framework of administrative divisions, Novokubansk serves as the administrative center of Novokubansky District. As an administrative division, it is incorporated within Novokubansky District as the Town of Novokubansk. As a municipal division, the Town of Novokubansk is incorporated within Novokubansky Municipal District as Novokubanskoye Urban Settlement.

Economy
Major federal roads and railway pass near Novokubansk. The town is very developed and it is the center of local food processing industry and agriculture. Surrounding Novokubansk are a number of orchards and wineries. A local brandy Big Prize is a famous product of one of the biggest wineries in the town. A large sugarcane production plant is situated at outskirts of Novokubansk. Also, one of the largest local experimental-industrial farms is headquartered in Novokubansk.

References

Notes

Sources

External links
Novokubansk photo portal

Cities and towns in Krasnodar Krai
Populated places established in 1867